Stenocybe is a genus of fungi in the family Mycocaliciaceae. It has 14 species.

Species
Stenocybe bartlettii 
Stenocybe clavata 
Stenocybe euspora 
Stenocybe flexuosa  – North America
Stenocybe fragmenta 
Stenocybe major 
Stenocybe mildeana 
Stenocybe montana 
Stenocybe nitida 
Stenocybe procrastinata  – western North America
Stenocybe pullatula 
Stenocybe septata 
Stenocybe spinosae 
Stenocybe tropica  – Brazil

References

Eurotiomycetes
Eurotiomycetes genera
Lichen genera
Taxa described in 1855
Taxa named by Gustav Wilhelm Körber